Kamila Soćko (born 12 November 1988 in Warsaw) is a Polish rower. At the 2012 Summer Olympics, she competed in the Women's quadruple sculls.

References

Polish female rowers
1988 births
Living people
Olympic rowers of Poland
Rowers at the 2012 Summer Olympics
Rowers from Warsaw
European Rowing Championships medalists